Some Honourable Members is a Canadian political talk show television series which aired on CBC Television from 1973 to 1975.

Premise
Each episode featured several Members of Parliament in a panel discussion on current political topics.  Some episodes featured an interview with a single politician instead.  The panel was not informed of the episode topics in advance, in order to promote spontaneous dialogue.

Scheduling
This half-hour series was broadcast for two seasons, first on Tuesdays at 10:30 p.m. (Eastern time) from 23 October 1973 to 7 May 1974, then on Thursdays at 10:30 p.m. from 26 September 1974 to 3 April 1975.

References

External links
 

CBC Television original programming
1973 Canadian television series debuts
1975 Canadian television series endings